Studied with the Saturn A-1 in 1959, the Saturn A-2 was deemed more powerful than the Saturn I rocket, consisting of a first stage, which actually flew on the Saturn IB, a second stage which contains four S-3 engines that flew on the Jupiter IRBM and a Centaur high-energy liquid-fueled third stage.

References 

 Koelle, Heinz Hermann, Handbook of Astronautical Engineering, McGraw-Hill, New York, 1961.
 Bilstein, Roger E, Stages to Saturn, US Government Printing Office, 1980. .

Saturn (rocket family)
Cancelled space launch vehicles